Atheist Refugee Relief (German: Säkulare Flüchtlingshilfe e. V.) is a non-governmental organisation founded in Cologne, Germany in 2017 in defence of human rights of apostates and nonreligious. The board consists of Rana Ahmad, Mahmudul Haque Munshi and Stefan Paintner. Further groups and associations were formed in Munich (2019), Austria (2019), Hamburg (2019), Stuttgart (2020) and Switzerland (2020).

Organization

Founding in 2017 
Atheist Refugee Relief reports that the personal story of Rana Ahmad's flight from Saudi Arabia to Germany in 2015 has been the inspiration to form the relief organization and the wider support network. The Giordano Bruno Foundation provided 10,000 euros in seed funding. In November 2017, Atheist Refugee Relief was presented to the public on the occasion of the 10th anniversary of the Central Council of Ex-Muslims in Cologne.

Board 
In 2020, the board of directors consists of Rana Ahmad, Mahmudul Haque Munshi and Stefan Paintner.

Members and supporters 
From the countries of origin, the following refugees and activists spoke about their case in public:

 Bangladesh: Mahmudul Haque Munshi
 Iraq: Amed Sherwan, Worood Zuhair
 Iran: Mina Ahadi, Mohamad Hosein Tavasolli, Farid Mahnad, Sina Nasiri
 Mauritania: Yahya Mustafa Ekhou
 Pakistan: Muhammad Ajeef, Alia Khannum
 Saudi Arabia: Rana Ahmad, Loujain Sultan
Syria: Abdulrahman Akkad

The following persons have endorsed the organisation in public:

 Hamed Abdel-Samad
 Lale Akgün
 Richard Dawkins
 Michael Schmidt-Salomon

Activities

Practical help 
In Germany, the organisation offers practical help to refugees in their contacts with authorities, doctors and lawyers, and assists them to find access to suitable language and integration courses, or physiological and psychological therapy after human rights violations. It is in regular contact with politicians and state authorities. In countries of origin, the organisation provides emergency humanitarian aid in acute crises for individuals and groups in various ways.

Information about countries of origin 
The organisation informs that in 13 countries worldwide (Afghanistan, Iran, Yemen, Malaysia, Maldives, Mauritania, Nigeria, Qatar, Pakistan, Saudi Arabia, Somalia, Sudan and the United Arab Emirates) the human right to freedom of religion and belief is punishable by death on charges of apostasy or blasphemy. Moreover, prison sentences can be imposed in more than 40 countries and in many countries important aspects of human rights, such as the right to self-determination, are violated.

Official perspectives 
From German government, several statements concerning Atheist Refugee Relief have been made and have been posted on the organisation's website, including Bärbel Kofler, Representative of the Federal Government for Human Rights Policy and Humanitarian Aid at the Federal Foreign Office; Michael Blume, Representative of the State Government of Baden-Württemberg against Anti-Semitism; Serap Güler, State Secretary at the Ministry for Children, Family, Refugees and Integration of the State of North Rhine-Westphalia and Doris Schröder-Köpf, State Commissioner for Migration and Participation of the State of Lower Saxony.

See also 

 Abdulrahman Akkad
Giordano Bruno Foundation
 Rana Ahmad
 Worood Zuhair

References

External links 
Official Website

2017 establishments in Germany
Anti-Islam sentiment in Germany